Robert Lijesen (born 5 February 1985 in Dordrecht) is a Dutch Swimmer, who is specialized in the 50 and 100 m freestyle. He is currently trained by former world champion Marcel Wouda at the same club as multiple olympic champion Pieter van den Hoogenband. He holds the European record in the 4 × 100 m freestyle Short Course together with Bas van Velthoven, Mitja Zastrow and Robin van Aggele in 3:09.18 swum during the World SC Championships 2008 in Manchester they finished second in this event behind the United States who swam a world record in the same race.

Swimming career
Lijesen made his international senior debut at the 2006 FINA Short Course World Championships in Shanghai with the 23rd place in the 100 m freestyle.

2008
He was part of the team that broke the European record in the 4 × 100 m freestyle (SC) at the 2008 FINA Short Course World Championships alongside Bas van Velthoven, Mitja Zastrow and Robin van Aggele winning a silver medal doing so. Individually he reached 17th place in the 50 m freestyle. With the 4 × 100 m medley relay he reached an 8th place together with Bastiaan Tamminga, van Aggele and Joeri Verlinden swimming a new national record.
 
A few weeks before at the 2008 European Aquatics Championships in Eindhoven he won the bronze medal in the 4 × 100 m freestyle, where he split faster than Pieter van den Hoogenband who was later revealed suffered from the flu. Individually he ended 12th in the 100 m freestyle, in the 50 m freestyle he reached the final where he finished 6th.

At the 2008 Summer Olympics he finished 10th in the 4 × 100 m freestyle with Zastrow, van den Hoogenband and van Velthoven. In the 50 m freestyle, his only individual start, he reached a 32nd spot.

See also 
 List of swimmers
 Dutch records in swimming
 European records in swimming

Personal bests

References

1985 births
Living people
Dutch male freestyle swimmers
Olympic swimmers of the Netherlands
Swimmers at the 2008 Summer Olympics
Sportspeople from Dordrecht
Medalists at the FINA World Swimming Championships (25 m)
European Aquatics Championships medalists in swimming
21st-century Dutch people